The Independent Monitoring Authority for the Citizens' Rights Agreements (IMA) is a body corporate set up in the United Kingdom by the European Union (Withdrawal Agreement) Act 2020 to monitor the functioning of the citizens’ rights provisions of the Brexit withdrawal agreement and to protect the rights of European Union citizens in the UK.

Based in Swansea, Wales, it is an executive non-departmental public body, sponsored by the Ministry of Justice. Its chair is Ashley Fox.

Role of the IMA 
When the United Kingdom made the decision to exit the European Union (EU) a formal agreement was established to protect citizens whom the exit would impact upon. As part of that, we have been established to make sure the agreement is being properly upheld. In specific terms, the Independent Monitoring Authority for the Citizens’ Rights Agreements (IMA) protects the rights of EU and EEA EFTA citizens, and their family members, in the UK and Gibraltar. Essentially, the IMA helps people from EU and EEA EFTA countries get the same rights as they did before the UK left the EU. The IMA are responsible for making sure that UK public bodies are respecting the rights of EU and EEA EFTA citizens and their family members. Public bodies can include:

 government departments (such as the Home Office or HM Revenue and Customs)
 devolved governments in Scotland, Wales and Northern Ireland
 government agencies (such as the Driver and Vehicle Licensing Agency)
 local councils
 non-departmental public bodies (such as NHS England or the Health and Safety Executive)
 public corporations (such as the BBC or the Pension Protection Fund)

Many of the organisations the IMA monitor are on the list of departments, agencies and public bodies on located on www.gov.uk. The IMA are also responsible for monitoring public bodies in Gibraltar.

Enforcement & Investigations

Home Office 
In October 2022, IMA took the Home Office to court, arguing that it is against the withdrawal agreement for the government to require EU citizens to apply for settled status upon the expiry of their pre-settled status.

References

External links

 Supporting EU citizens in the UK after Brexit

Brexit withdrawal agreement